El Fadrí, also known as the Fadri Tower, is a standing alone bell-tower of the Gothic procathedral Castelló Cathedral of Castellón de la Plana, Spain. It was built in the 15th century, commencing in 1440 and completed in 1604. It was built in Valencian Gothic style. A discontinuous spiral staircase gives access to the clock chamber, the clergyman's cell, the bell ringer's home, and the bell chamber.

References

Towers completed in 1604
Buildings and structures in the Province of Castellón
Towers in Spain
Bien de Interés Cultural landmarks in the Province of Castellón
1604 establishments in Spain